Robert D. Galliers is Bentley University’s Distinguished Professor Emeritus having previously served as Provost. He also holds an honorary appointment as Visiting Professor of Information Systems at Loughborough University. Previously, Bob held professorships at the London School of Economics, Warwick Business School (where he served as Dean), and Curtin University. He has held a number of visiting professorships internationally and serves on various university advisory boards. He is the former editor-in-chief of The Journal of Strategic Information Systems, which he has led from 1991 (its foundation) to December 2018; Bob is a Fellow of the British Computer Society, the Royal Society of Arts, and the Association for Information Systems, of which he was President in 1999. He received the Association for Information Systems LEO Award  for exceptional lifetime achievement in 2012 and an Honorary Doctor of Science degree from Turku University, Finland in 1995.
Bob Galliers has widely published in leading Information Systems journals such as MIS Quarterly, Information Systems Research and the Journal of Management Information Systems.

Among notable contributions to the field of Information Systems, Professor Galliers introduced the notion of Information Systems Strategizing (in contrast with Michael Porter's conception of strategy). Strategizing, according to his latest publications, involves ongoing processes of knowledge exploration and exploitation.

See also

Frank Land

References

Bentley University faculty
Living people
Year of birth missing (living people)
Information systems researchers